Here Are The Sonics (stylized as !!!Here Are The Sonics!!!) is the debut album by American garage rock band the Sonics, released in March 1965. The album features the original songs "The Witch" (a minor regional hit), "Psycho", "Boss Hoss" and "Strychnine", along with an assortment of rock and roll and R&B covers.

Release 
!!!Here Are The Sonics!!! was released in 1965 by record label Etiquette. It was re-released in 1999 in mono by Norton Records.

Reception 

Cub Koda of AllMusic wrote that the album "show[s] a live band at the peak of its power, ready to mow down the competition without even blinking twice", calling it "Another important chunk of Seattle rock and roll history."

The album was included in Robert Dimery's 1001 Albums You Must Hear Before You Die.

Track listing

Personnel 
The Sonics

 Gerry Roslie – organ, piano, lead vocals
 Andy Parypa – bass guitar
 Larry Parypa – lead guitar, vocals
 Rob Lind – saxophone, vocals, harmonica
 Bob Bennett – drums

Technical
 Buck Ornsby – production
 Kent Morrill – production
 Kearney Barton – engineering
 John L. Vlahovich – sleeve design
 Pete Ciccone/Immaculate Concepts – sleeve layout
 Jini Dellaccio – cover photography

References

External links 
 
 Here Are The Sonics (Adobe Flash) at Radio3Net (streamed copy where licensed)

1965 debut albums
The Sonics albums
Norton Records albums
Protopunk albums